Sicydium is a genus of gobies native to fast-flowing streams and rivers of the Americas (Central America, Mexico, Cocos Island, the Caribbean, Colombia, Ecuador and Venezuela) with a couple species native to Middle Africa.

Species
There are currently 16 recognized species in this genus:
 Sicydium adelum W. A. Bussing, 1996
 Sicydium altum Meek, 1907
 Sicydium brevifile Ogilvie-Grant, 1884
 Sicydium buscki Evermann & H. W. Clark, 1906
 Sicydium bustamantei Greeff, 1884
 Sicydium cocoensis (Heller & Snodgrass, 1903)
 Sicydium crenilabrum I. J. Harrison, 1993
 Sicydium fayae Brock, 1942
 Sicydium gilberti Watson, 2000
 Sicydium gymnogaster Ogilvie-Grant, 1884 (Smoothbelly goby)
 Sicydium hildebrandi C. H. Eigenmann, 1918
 Sicydium multipunctatum Regan, 1906 (Multispotted goby)
 Sicydium plumieri (Bloch, 1786) (Sirajo)
 Sicydium punctatum Perugia, 1896 (Spotted algae-eating goby)
 Sicydium rosenbergii (Boulenger, 1899)
 Sicydium salvini Ogilvie-Grant, 1884

References

 
Sicydiinae